Acrolepiopsis reticulosa is a moth of the family Acrolepiidae. It is only known from two widely separated locations in Wyoming and New Mexico.

The length of the forewings 7.3–8.6 mm.

References

Moths described in 1927
Acrolepiidae